The Big Mo ("Big Momentum") is behavioral momentum that operates on a large scale.  The concept originally applied to sporting events in the 1960s in the United States, as momentum appeared to have an effect on a team's performance. Successful teams were said to have "The Big Mo" on their side.  This has since extended situations in which momentum is a driving factor, such as during political campaigns, social upheavals, economic cycles, and financial bubbles.

In modern history
The term was used by George H. W. Bush during his quest for the Republican nomination to run for President in 1980. After he won the Iowa caucuses, and was facing further contests, Bush Senior said: "Now they will be after me, howling and yowling at my heels. What we will have is momentum. We will look forward to Big Mo being on our side, as they say in athletics." 

Eventually, Bush lost to Ronald Reagan who went on to become the 40th President of the United States, with Bush as his Vice President.

Impact
Research conducted in 2005, by Christopher Hull at Georgetown University, US, suggested that from 1980 to 2000, "Big Mo" (large scale momentum) had amplified key events in US presidential races.

In 2007, three researchers from the London Business School, Elroy Dimson, Paul Marsh and Mike Staunton, observed in their paper "108 Years of Momentum Profits" that "momentum appears to have an inordinate and unexplained impact on the behaviour of investment markets that contradicts the efficient market theory". One of the researchers, Dr Paul Marsh said, "We remain puzzled (by these findings) and we are not the only ones; most academics are vaguely embarrassed by this."

In the lead-up to the British election in May 2010, James Forsyth, the political editor of The Spectator magazine, wrote, "The Big Mo is with the Tories. In a campaign, momentum matters. It is, for good or ill, the prism through which the media report things."

In 2010, an analysis conducted by Mark Roeder, a former executive at the Swiss-based UBS Bank, suggested that Big Mo "played a pivotal role" in the 2008–09 global financial crisis. Roeder suggested that,

In January 2011, a report in The Economist magazine, titled "The Big Mo", said,

Theoretical analysis
The mechanism by which momentum influences human behaviour on a large scale is not known, but a number of theories exist. In 1982, a research team led by John Nevin, Professor Emeritus of Psychology at the University of New Hampshire, US, together with Charlotte Mandel and Jean Atak, wrote a paper called "The Analysis of Behavioural Momentum", in which they explored why certain behaviours can become persistent over time. The team proposed that people's tendency to continue to behave in a certain way, and resist change, is dependent on the type of reinforcement they receive. The team developed a method for calculating the impact of behavioural momentum, based on the Newtonian formula: ΔV = f / m, in which ΔV is the change in velocity or, in behavioural terms, response rate; Velocity (V) refers to the response rate; mass (m) refers to the response strength, and force (f) refers to the change in the contingencies for the behaviour (i.e., environment change). The work of Nevin, Mandel and Atak has been influential in the development of social and health-care policies, such as drug rehabilitation programs, where behavioural persistence (momentum) and relapse are critical issues. 

More controversial theories about behavioural momentum derive from quantum physics and quantum field theory. In her book The Field, author Lyn McTaggart cites experiments that show that in certain group environments that, "each member of the group becomes less highly-tuned to their own separate information and more receptive to that of other group members. In effect, they pick up someone else's information from the 'field' as if it were their own". She says this phenomenon is akin to what sports teams experience when they "enter the zone" and are influenced by momentum.

See also
 Behavioral momentum
 Bandwagon effect
 Critical mass
 Domino effect
 Network effect
 Virtuous circle and vicious circle

References

Big Mo
Big Mo